Dear Desolation is the fourth studio album by Australian deathcore band Thy Art Is Murder. The album was released on 18 August 2017 by Nuclear Blast. The record is the band's last album with founding drummer Lee Stanton, as well as the first to feature Kevin Butler on bass.

Background
Following the release of their third full-length album Holy War in 2015, vocalist CJ McMahon briefly left the band. In January 2017, the band announced McMahon's return and released the stand-alone single "No Absolution" (a B-side from the Holy War recording sessions) as part of the announcement.

Critical reception

The album received generally positive reviews from music critics. Exclaim! called it "the band's strongest album to date", noting the band's stylistic shift from deathcore towards conventional death metal inspired by bands like Behemoth and Cannibal Corpse. It has been described as continuing their prior deathcore sound by Metal Hammer. Metal Hammer praised McMahon's vocal performance, and wrote that though the album is "short on the penetrative hooks that Holy War possessed in abundance, Into Chaos We Climb and The Final Curtain's seismic jolts and haunting leads leave an indelible mark for deathcore disciples to latch onto."

Track listing

Personnel

Thy Art Is Murder
 Chris "CJ" McMahon – vocals
 Andy Marsh – lead guitar
 Sean Delander – rhythm guitar
 Kevin Butler – bass guitar
 Lee Stanton – drums

Production
 Eliran Kantor – artwork
 Will Putney – mixing, mastering, production, engineering
 Randy LeBeouf – additional engineering
 Steve Seid – additional engineering
 Randy Slaugh – additional programming

Charts

References

2017 albums
Thy Art Is Murder albums
Nuclear Blast albums
Albums produced by Will Putney